Handel's Messiah: A Soulful Celebration is a gospel album by various artists, released in 1992 on Warner Alliance. Executive produced by Norman Miller, Gail Hamilton and Mervyn Warren, it is a reinterpretation of the 1741 oratorio Messiah by George Frideric Handel, and has been widely praised for its use of multiple genres of African-American music, including spirituals, blues, ragtime, big band, jazz fusion, R&B and hip hop.

The album received the 1992 Grammy Award for Best Contemporary Soul Gospel Album, as well as the 1992 Dove Award for Contemporary Gospel Album of the Year. In 1993, the various recording artists participating in the project were collectively nominated for the NAACP Image Award for Outstanding Gospel Artist.

Track listing

Chart positions

Album

References

1992 albums
Warner Records albums
Concept albums
All-star recordings
George Frideric Handel